is a museum of Ancient Near Eastern, Roman provincial, Byzantine, Sassanian, and Islamic Art in  Okayama, Okayama Prefecture, Japan. As of 2007 there were some 4,852 items, including winged Assyrian reliefs. The museum is a prize-winning design by Okada & Associates.

See also

 Orient
 Antiquities trade
 Miho Museum
 Okayama Station

References

External links
 Homepage

Okayama
Museums in Okayama Prefecture
Art museums and galleries in Japan
Museums of Ancient Near East in Asia
Museums of ancient Rome